Nicki Janna Francisca Pouw-Verweij (born 21 May 1991) is a Dutch physician and politician. She has served as member of the House of Representatives for JA21 since March 2021.

Pouw-Verweij studied medicine at the Vrije Universiteit Amsterdam and is working on a PhD in rheumatology at the VU University Medical Center.

As a member of Forum for Democracy (FvD), Pouw-Verweij was elected to the Provincial Council of Utrecht in March 2019, and to the Senate in June 2019. She took maternity leave from the Senate from July to November 2019, and was replaced by Otto Hermans during this period. Pouw-Verweij left Forum for Democracy on 26 November 2020 because of controversial statements uttered by the party's leader Thierry Baudet. On 29 November, she formed the Van Pareren group (renamed the Nanninga group on 15 February 2021) along with four other former FvD Senators. The group became affiliated with the JA21 party on 24 December 2020.

In the 2021 general election, Pouw-Verweij was elected to the House of Representatives, receiving 16,302 preference votes. She took office on 31 March 2021, giving up her seat in the Senate, and resigning from the Provincial Council of Utrecht on 14 April.

References

External links 
 Nicki Pouw-Verweij, House of Representatives
 N.J.F. Pouw-Verweij (JA21), Senate

1991 births
Living people
21st-century Dutch physicians
21st-century Dutch politicians
21st-century Dutch women politicians
21st-century women physicians
Dutch rheumatologists
Forum for Democracy (Netherlands) politicians
Independent politicians in the Netherlands
JA21 politicians
Members of the House of Representatives (Netherlands)
Members of the Provincial Council of Utrecht
Members of the Senate (Netherlands)
People from IJsselstein
Vrije Universiteit Amsterdam alumni
Women rheumatologists